Huckaville, also known as Liberty Hill, is an unincorporated community in Covington County, Alabama, United States.

History
A post office operated under the name Liberty Hill from 1892 to 1907.

References

Unincorporated communities in Covington County, Alabama
Unincorporated communities in Alabama